The 1979 Royal Tru-Orange season was the 5th season of the franchise in the Philippine Basketball Association (PBA).

Transactions

Championship
In the Second (Open) Conference, the Orangemen signed 6-7 Larry Pounds, a fifth-round draftee of the Golden State Warriors in 1975, and 6-11 Otto Moore, a veteran of NBA wars for nine seasons, as their imports. Royal emerge on top of the standings after the two-round eliminations with 13 wins and 3 losses and made it to the championship round by posting a 5-1 won-loss slate in the semifinals. On October 23, RTO defeated Crispa, 110–102, to reach the PBA finals for the first time in franchise history. 

On November 6, Royal Tru-Orange won their first PBA crown by defeating the Toyota Tamaraws, 102–101, rookie Ramon Dizon was the spark that ignited veterans on the team (Photographed here) Game 4 of the title playoffs for a 3–1 series victory. The Orangemen took the first two games, 104–99 and 100–95, the Tamaraws avoided a sweep by winning the third game, 99–98.

Royal Tru-Orange joins U/Tex Wranglers as the only other ballclub not named Crispa or Toyota, to have won a PBA title in the 1970s as RTO mentor and former olympian Edgardo Ocampo won his first championship as a head coach.

Roster

References

San Miguel Beermen seasons
Royal